IROC XXVI was the 26th season of the True Value International Race of Champions, which began on Friday, February 15, 2002 at Daytona International Speedway. The roster included 12 drivers from five separate racing leagues. The first race saw Tony Stewart earn his second IROC win. Rookie Kevin Harvick won in only his second start in race 2 at California. In the first ever IROC race at Chicagoland, Buddy Lazier, Al Unser Jr., and Hélio Castroneves gave the IRL a sweep of the top three positions in the race. In race 4 at Indianapolis, Dale Jarrett took the lead in turn one of the first lap and led the entire race for his second career IROC victory. Kevin Harvick became just the sixth driver to win the IROC title in his first season of competition, and also became the first driver to win the title while representing the NASCAR Busch Series.

The roster of drivers and final points standings were as follows: 



Race One (Daytona International Speedway)
 Tony Stewart
 Sam Hornish Jr.
 Scott Sharp
 Jack Sprague
 Al Unser Jr.
 Danny Lasoski
 Bobby Labonte
 Sterling Marlin
 Kevin Harvick
 Buddy Lazier
 Hélio Castroneves
 Dale Jarrett

Race Two (California Speedway)
 Kevin Harvick
 Bobby Labonte
 Dale Jarrett
 Sterling Marlin
 Jack Sprague
 Tony Stewart
 Hélio Castroneves
 Al Unser Jr.
 Buddy Lazier
 Scott Sharp
 Sam Hornish Jr.
 Danny Lasoski

Race Three (Chicagoland Speedway)
 Buddy Lazier
 Al Unser Jr.
 Hélio Castroneves
 Kevin Harvick
 Scott Sharp
 Sam Hornish Jr.
 Sterling Marlin
 Bobby Labonte
 Dale Jarrett
 Jack Sprague
 Danny Lasoski
 Tony Stewart

Race Four (Indianapolis Motor Speedway)
 Dale Jarrett
 Hélio Castroneves
 Ken Schrader
 Buddy Lazier
 Kevin Harvick
 Jack Sprague
 Sterling Marlin
 Scott Sharp
 Bobby Labonte
 Sam Hornish Jr.
 Tony Stewart

References

International Race of Champions
2002 in American motorsport